In geometry, the gyrobifastigium is the 26th Johnson solid. It can be constructed by joining two face-regular triangular prisms along corresponding square faces, giving a quarter-turn to one prism. It is the only Johnson solid that can tile three-dimensional space.

Despite the fact that  would yield a geometrically identical equivalent to the Johnson solid, it lacks a circumscribed sphere that touches all vertices, except for the case   which represents a uniform great duoantiprism.

Its dual, the elongated tetragonal disphenoid, can be found as cells of the duals of the  duoantiprisms.

History and name

The name of the gyrobifastigium comes from the Latin fastigium, meaning a sloping roof. In the standard naming convention of the Johnson solids, bi- means two solids connected at their bases, and gyro- means the two halves are twisted with respect to each other.

The gyrobifastigium's place in the list of Johnson solids, immediately before the bicupolas, is explained by viewing it as a digonal gyrobicupola. Just as the other regular cupolas have an alternating sequence of squares and triangles surrounding a single polygon at the top (triangle, square or pentagon), each half of the gyrobifastigium consists of just alternating squares and triangles, connected at the top only by a ridge.

Honeycomb
The gyrated triangular prismatic honeycomb can be constructed by packing together large numbers of identical gyrobifastigiums.
The gyrobifastigium is one of five convex polyhedra with regular faces capable of space-filling (the others being the cube, truncated octahedron, triangular prism, and hexagonal prism) and it is the only Johnson solid capable of doing so.

Cartesian coordinates
Cartesian coordinates for the gyrobifastigium with regular faces and unit edge lengths may easily be derived from the formula of the height of unit edge length

as follows:

To calculate formulae for the surface area and volume of a gyrobifastigium with regular faces and with edge length a, one may simply adapt the corresponding formulae for the triangular prism:

Topologically equivalent polyhedra

Schmitt–Conway–Danzer biprism 

The Schmitt–Conway–Danzer biprism (also called a SCD prototile) is a polyhedron topologically equivalent to the gyrobifastigium, but with parallelogram and irregular triangle faces instead of squares and equilateral triangles. Like the gyrobifastigium, it can fill space, but only aperiodically or with a screw symmetry, not with a full three-dimensional group of symmetries. Thus, it provides a partial solution to the three-dimensional einstein problem.

Dual 

The dual polyhedron of the gyrobifastigium has 8 faces: 4 isosceles triangles, corresponding to the valence-3 vertices of the gyrobifastigium, and 4 parallelograms corresponding to the valence-4 equatorial vertices.

See also
Elongated gyrobifastigium
Elongated octahedron

References

External links
 

Johnson solids
Space-filling polyhedra